The Schenectady and Duanesburgh Railroad, incorporated in July 1873, was a predecessor of the Delaware and Hudson Railway that owned the  line between the Saratoga and Schenectady Railroad at Schenectady and the Albany and Susquehanna Railroad at Delanson. It was incorporated on December 27, 1869, as the Schenectady and Susquehanna Railroad, and opened in about August 1872, always leased to the Delaware and Hudson Canal Company. The property was sold under foreclosure on July 10, 1873, and conveyed to the Schenectady and Duanesburgh Railroad on July 12. The company was merged into the Delaware and Hudson Company on August 4, 1903.

References

Defunct New York (state) railroads
Schenectady County, New York
Predecessors of the Delaware and Hudson Railway
Railway companies established in 1873
Railway companies disestablished in 1903
1873 establishments in New York (state)
American companies established in 1873